The key political players in Manipur state in north-east India are the ruling Indian National Congress, BJP

National Politics of Manipur
There are only 2 Lok Sabha (lower house of the Indian Parliament) constituencies in Manipur.

The State Politics of Manipur

The Manipur Legislative Assembly has 60 seats directly elected from single-seat constituencies.

Also see this
 Manipur Legislative Assembly

Reference